Mineral water is water from a mineral spring that contains various minerals, such as salts and sulfur compounds. Mineral water may usually be still or sparkling (carbonated/effervescent) according to the presence or absence of added gases.

Traditionally, mineral waters were used or consumed at their spring sources, often referred to as "taking the waters" or "taking the cure", at places such as spas, baths, or wells. The term spa was used for a place where the water was consumed and bathed in; bath where the water was used primarily for bathing, therapeutics, or recreation; and well where the water was to be consumed.

Today, it is far more common for mineral water to be bottled at the source for distributed consumption. Travelling to the mineral water site for direct access to the water is now uncommon, and in many cases not possible because of exclusive commercial ownership rights. There are more than 4,000 brands of mineral water commercially available worldwide.

In many places the term "mineral water" is colloquially used to mean any bottled carbonated water or soda water, as opposed to tap water.

Composition

The more calcium and magnesium ions that are dissolved in water, the harder it is said to be; water with few dissolved calcium and magnesium ions is described as being soft.

The U.S. Food and Drug Administration classifies mineral water as water containing at least 250 parts per million total dissolved solids (TDS), originating from a geologically and physically protected underground water source. No minerals may be added to this water.

In the European Union, bottled water may be called mineral water when it is bottled at the source and has undergone no or minimal treatment. Permitted is the removal of iron, manganese, sulfur and arsenic through decantation, filtration or treatment with ozone-enriched air, insofar as this treatment does not alter the composition of the water as regards to the essential constituents which give it its properties. No additions are permitted except for carbon dioxide, which may be added, removed or re-introduced by exclusively physical methods. No disinfection treatment is permitted, nor is the addition of any bacteriostatic agents.

See also

 Bottled water
 Drinking water
 Lithia water 
 Mineral spa
 Water quality

References

Source

Bibliography

External links

 Bottled Water of the World: Worldwide Bottled Water Brands Listed by Country
 Eupedia: List of European mineral water brands with mineral analysis